Son of Sam is the fifth project by American hip hop recording artist Lucki and his second extended play; it was released on March 22, 2016.

Background
Lucki released the first song "Selful" in November 2015, but was soon deleted for unknown reasons. On December 18, 2015, Lucki released "Jigga 98" with only his verse.

Track listing

References

2016 EPs
Lucki albums